SDIB is a reggae rock band based out of San Diego, California. Their acronym stands for San Diego Island Boys as a tribute to their Hawaiian heritage. The band is currently on hiatus with members involved in other projects. SDIB has released two albums, which charted in the iTunes top 10 for 2007 and 2014.

History
SDIB (or San Diego Island Boys), originally from Hawaii formed in San Diego, California in 2007. They took inspiration from their favorite reggae artists like Peter Tosh, Mighty Diamonds and fellow Hawaiian reggae originators Natural Vibrations with a smooth rock-steady reggae island sound.

They released their debut full-length self-titled album on Aku Roots Records on November 27, 2007. It featured popular singles, "Midnight Hour" and "Sugar".

On May 6, 2013, SDIB released their second studio album, simply titled, II also on Aku Roots Records. They recorded the album in San Diego's Studio West, The Den Of Inspiration. The album reached the #2 selling reggae album on Amazon and the #4 selling reggae album on iTunes.

Their single from the album, "Cruise Day" was played heavily on Oahu's Island 98.5 "Top 5@5".

Lineup
Current band members
 Anthony Kua – Lead Vocals, Ukulele, Guitar, Bass, Keyboard
 Jeff Iwashita – Ukulele, Vocals
 Pauahi Ontai – Guitar, Vocals

Former band members
 John Naki – Drums, Vocals
 Carlos Sigarroa – Keyboard
 Adam Cruz – Bass

Discography
Studio albums
 SDIB (2007)
 II (2013)

Singles

External links

References

American reggae musical groups